Maycenvale United AFC is a semi-professional football (soccer) club based in Hastings, New Zealand. They compete in the local Pacific Premiership competition in Hawke's Bay. The club is strongly 'family orientated' club with over 200 playing members both seniors and many junior football teams.

The name Maycenvale comes from three Hastings primary schools, Mayfair, Central and Park Vale; when the club started with five Junior teams in 1975, most of the children came from one of these three schools.

The club boasts a rich history of competing at the highest levels in Hawke's Bay with a number of titles over the years. The club currently has a Premiership, reserves and two conference league teams in the local Hawke's Bay competitions.

External links
Maycenvale United AFC Official club website
Maycenvale United AFC Ultimate NZ Soccer page

Association football clubs in New Zealand
Association football clubs established in 1975
Sport in Hastings, New Zealand
1975 establishments in New Zealand